A quickfire is a type of arson sometimes employed in blood feuds in medieval Scandinavia and Iceland.

Quickfire may also refer to:

Quickfire (TV show), a 10-minute cooking show aired on Q, hosted by Rosebud Benitez, and sponsored by Ajinomoto

See also
Arson (disambiguation)